Ankyrin repeat and SOCS box protein 3 is a protein that in humans is encoded by the ASB3 gene.

The protein encoded by this gene is a member of the ankyrin repeat and SOCS box-containing (ASB) family of proteins. They contain ankyrin repeat sequence and SOCS box domain. The SOCS box serves to couple suppressor of cytokine signalling (SOCS) proteins and their binding partners with the elongin B and C complex, possibly targeting them for degradation. Multiple alternatively spliced transcript variants have been described for this gene but some of the full length sequences are not known.

References

External links

Further reading